Kifraya or Kafraiya is a village in the Koura District, in the Northern Governorate of Lebanon. The population is  Maronite and Sunni. the village is famous for its ties in Lebanese politics and its history within the Syrian Social Nationalist Party.

References

External links
 Kefraiya, Localiban

Populated places in the North Governorate
Koura District
Sunni Muslim communities in Lebanon
Maronite Christian communities in Lebanon